Randy Vasquez (born October 16, 1961) is an American actor and director.

Early life

Vasquez was born in Escondido, California. He attended Escondido High School and is a cousin of actor and director James Vasquez, who also grew up in Escondido. His father, a school teacher and accountant, is of Mexican ancestry and his mother was a coal miner's daughter, originally from West Virginia. Vasquez's parents divorced in 1966 and he elected to live with his father in Escondido. He initially attended the University of California, Los Angeles before dropping out in 1979 to become an actor. Talent manager Bob Marcucci spotted him in an acting class and helped him find auditions. In 1984, he got his first role, a small part on Highway to Heaven.

Career
Since debuting on television in 1984, Vasquez has made several appearances in TV series, most notably as Marcos in Acapulco H.E.A.T. and as Gunnery Sergeant Victor Galindez in JAG. In 1998, he was cast as bartender Paolo Kaire on Love Boat: The Next Wave. In 2002, he moved into film direction with Testimony, a documentary about Salvadorean activist Maria Guardado. In 2005, he directed a comedic drama titled Perceptions. In 2009, Vasquez returned to UCLA, where he earned a bachelor's degree in American Indian Studies. His 2011 film The Thick Dark Fog won the Best Documentary award at the 36th annual American Indian Film Festival. In 2017, he directed a third documentary, Badger Creek, a film about a Blackfeet Nation family.

Partial filmography
Highway to Heaven (TV) (Help Wanted: Angel) (1984)
Beverly Hills Cop (1984) .... Beverly Palms Hotel Bellhop (as Randy Gallion)
Knots Landing (TV) (6 episodes) (1989–1990) .... Ricardo Fonseca
Almost an Angel (1990) .... Hood Nervo at Bank
Acapulco H.E.A.T. (TV) (22 episodes) (1993–1994) .... Marcos
The Demolitionist (1995) .... Henry 'Little Henry' Burne
The Stranger (1995) .... Marcus
Moonbase (1997) .... Masani
Sliders (TV) (1 episode) (1997) .... Carlos
Love Boat: The Next Wave (TV) (6 episodes) (1998) .... Bar Manager Paolo Kaire
First Monday (TV) (13 episodes) (2002) .... Miguel Mora
JAG (TV) (48 episodes) (1999–2003) .... Gunnery Sergeant Victor 'Gunny' Galindez
Perceptions (2005) .... Mark Westin
Level Seven (2008) .... Warden Vasquez
The Rookie - S4E3 In the Line of Fire (2021) .... Arson Investigator Breeze

References

External links

1961 births
Living people
Hispanic and Latino American male actors
American male television actors
American male film actors
People from Escondido, California
Male actors from California
American male actors of Mexican descent
American film directors of Mexican descent
University of California, Los Angeles alumni